Oleria makrena, the makrena clearwing, is a butterfly of the family Nymphalidae. It is found in South America, including Venezuela, Ecuador, Colombia and Bolivia.

The wingspan is about 52 mm.

Subspecies
Oleria makrena makrena (Venezuela, Ecuador)
Oleria makrena caucana (Colombia)
Oleria makrena schoenfelderi (Bolivia)

There are three undescribed subspecies. Two from Colombia and one from Panama.

Ithomiini
Nymphalidae of South America